Urbandale may refer to: 

 Urbandale, Iowa, a city with a population of 39,463 at the 2010 U.S. Census
 Urbandale, Illinois, an unincorporated community
 Urbandale, Ottawa, a neighbourhood in Ottawa